Old Stone House, also known as the Robert Sitlington House, is a historic home located near Millboro Springs, Bath County, Virginia. It was built about 1790, and is a two-story, three bay, rectangular stone dwelling.  It features a two-story gallery added in the late-19th century and an interior end brick chimney at each gable end. It is believed to be the oldest known stone house in the county, and it is one of the few examples of stone architecture of any period in the area.

It was listed on the National Register of Historic Places in 1983.

References

Houses on the National Register of Historic Places in Virginia
Houses completed in 1790
Houses in Bath County, Virginia
National Register of Historic Places in Bath County, Virginia
Stone houses in Virginia
1790 establishments in Virginia